Massachusetts House of Representatives' 2nd Middlesex district in the United States is one of 160 legislative districts included in the lower house of the Massachusetts General Court. It covers part of Middlesex County. Democrat Jim Arciero of Westford has represented the district since 2009.

Towns represented
The district includes the following localities:
 part of Chelmsford
 Littleton
 Westford

The current district geographic boundary overlaps with those of the Massachusetts Senate's 1st Middlesex district, 3rd Middlesex district, and Middlesex and Worcester district.

Former locale
The district previously covered part of Charlestown, circa 1872.

Representatives
 Joseph Caldwell, circa 1858 
 Lyman Pray, circa 1858-1859 
 Paul Willard, circa 1858 
 James F. Dwinell, circa 1859 
 George Close, circa 1888 
 John W. Wilkinson, circa 1888 
 James E. Curry, circa 1920 
 Clarence P. Kidder, circa 1920 
 Julius Meyers, circa 1920 
 Francis John Good, circa 1951 
 Francis W. Lindstrom, circa 1951 
 Walter Joseph Sullivan, circa 1951 
 Mary B. Newman, 1953–1954 and 1957–1970
 Thomas H. D. Mahoney, circa 1975 
 James Arciero, 2009-current

See also
 List of Massachusetts House of Representatives elections
 Other Middlesex County districts of the Massachusetts House of Representatives: 1st, 3rd, 4th, 5th, 6th, 7th, 8th, 9th, 10th, 11th, 12th, 13th, 14th, 15th, 16th, 17th, 18th, 19th, 20th, 21st, 22nd, 23rd, 24th, 25th, 26th, 27th, 28th, 29th, 30th, 31st, 32nd, 33rd, 34th, 35th, 36th, 37th
 List of Massachusetts General Courts
 List of former districts of the Massachusetts House of Representatives

Images
Portraits of legislators

References

External links
 Ballotpedia
  (State House district information based on U.S. Census Bureau's American Community Survey).
 League of Women Voters of Westford
 League of Women Voters of Chelmsford

House
Government of Middlesex County, Massachusetts